Peter Simonini (born January 19, 1957 in Somerville, Massachusetts) was an American soccer goalkeeper who was the 1983 American Soccer League MVP.  He spent two seasons in the North American Soccer League, one in the American Soccer League, one in the United Soccer League and one in the Major Indoor Soccer League.  He later served as the head coach of the Bentley College men's soccer team for twenty years.

Player
Simonini attended Plymouth State University, playing on the soccer team from 1976 to 1979. He finished his career with a 0.35 goals against average, an NCAA Division III record. In 1990, Plymouth State inducted Simonini into its Hall of Fame.  The New England Tea Men of the North American Soccer League drafted Simonini in the first round (third overall) of the 1980 NASL College Draft.  He saw time in five games that season.  Following the 1980 season, the Tea Men moved to Florida and became the Jacksonville Tea Men.  Following the 1982 season, the Tea Men left the NASL and moved to the second division American Soccer League.  The Tea Men defeated the Pennsylvania Stoners to win the 1983 championship as Simonini was chosen as the league MVP.  The ASL collapsed at the end of the 1983 season and the Tea Men moved to the newly established United Soccer League.  The Dallas Sidekicks of Major Indoor Soccer League (MISL) signed Simonini as a free agent on September 14, 1984.  He played two games with Dallas before suffering a season ending knee injury in November 1984.

Coach
Simonini has served as the head coach of the NCAA Division II Bentley College soccer team from 1987 to 2007.  He finished his tenure with a 188-167-19 record.  Simonini has also served as an assistant coach with the New Hampshire Phantoms of the USISL.  From 1996 to 1999 and again in 2004, Simonini was the goalkeeper coach for the New England Revolution of Major League Soccer.  He later moved on to coaching youth soccer, becoming a goalkeeper coach for Duxbury Football Club (DFC) in Duxbury, Massachusetts. He helped lead them to a 6-1-1 record and the Maple D5 title in 2014. His protégés, Tim Mehrmann and Jacob Hochstein, went on to become the goalkeepers for Duxbury High School.

References

External links
 Dallas Sidekicks player profile
 1984-1985 Dallas Sidekicks Media Guide
 NASL/MISL stats

1957 births
Living people
American soccer players
American soccer coaches
Bentley Falcons men's soccer coaches
New England Tea Men players
Jacksonville Tea Men players
American Soccer League (1933–1983) players
United Soccer League (1984–85) players
Dallas Sidekicks (original MISL) players
Major Indoor Soccer League (1978–1992) players
North American Soccer League (1968–1984) players
North American Soccer League (1968–1984) indoor players
College men's soccer coaches in the United States
New England Revolution non-playing staff
Association football goalkeepers
USISL coaches
Major League Soccer coaches
Plymouth State Panthers men's soccer players
Association football goalkeeping coaches